Clark James "Slim" Johnson (December 20, 1918 - September 15, 1987) was an American baseball pitcher in the Negro leagues and Mexican League.  He played with the Toledo/Indianapolis Crawfords in 1939 and 1940 and the Carta Blanca de Monterrey in 1941.

References

External links
 and Seamheads

Toledo Crawfords players
Sultanes de Monterrey players
1918 births
1987 deaths
Baseball pitchers